Marginella bavayi is a species of sea snail, a marine gastropod mollusk in the family Marginellidae, the margin snails.

Description
The length of the shell attains 8 mm.

Distribution
This marine species occurs off Mauritania.

References

 Cossignani T. (2006). Marginellidae & Cystiscidae of the World. L'Informatore Piceno. 408pp.
 Boyer F. (2017). Un cas d'espèces jumelles allotopiques: Marginella festiva Kiener, 1841 et M. bavayi Dautzenberg, 1910. Xenophora Taxonomy. 15: 45–52.

External links
 Dautzenberg P. (1910). Contribution à la faune malacologique de l'Afrique occidentale. Actes de la Société Linnéenne de Bordeaux. 64: 47–228, pls 1–4

bavayi
Gastropods described in 1910